Apterobiroina is a genus of flies belonging to the family Lesser Dung flies.

Taxonomy 

 Class Insecta 
 Subclass Pterygota 
 Infraclass Neoptera
 Superorder Holometabola
 Order Diptera
 Suborder Brachycera
 Infraorder Muscomorpha
 Family Sphaeroceridae
 Genus Apterobiroina
 Species Apterobiroina Australis

Species
A. australis Papp, 1979

References

Sphaeroceridae
Diptera of Australasia
Brachycera genera